José Lopez may refer to:

Sportspeople

Football
José López (footballer, born 1914), Spanish footballer
Juan José López (born 1950), Argentine football manager and former player
José López Ramírez (born 1975), Spanish 5-a-side football player
José Luis López (Mexican footballer) (born 1979), Mexican footballer
José Gilberto López (born 1994), Mexican footballer
José Manuel López (footballer) (born 2000), Argentine footballer
José Alfredo López, Argentine footballer
José López (Chilean footballer)

Cycling
José López (cyclist) (born 1910), Argentine cyclist
José Manuel López Rodríguez (born 1940), Spanish cyclist
José Antonio López (born 1976), Spanish cyclist

Boxing
José Toluco López (1932–1972), Mexican lightweight boxer
José López (boxer) (born 1972), Puerto Rican boxer
José Luis López (boxer) (born 1973), Mexican welterweight boxer
José Eduardo López (born 1990), Mexican light welterweight boxer

Other sports
José López (Negro leagues) (1901–?), Cuban baseball player
José López (wrestler) (born 1930), Cuban Olympic wrestler
José Perurena López (born 1945), Spanish sprint canoer
José Ramón López (born 1950), Spanish sprint canoer
Juan Manuel López Iturriaga (born 1959), Spanish basketball player
José María López  (born 1983), Argentine race-car driver
José López (first baseman) (born 1983), Venezuelan baseball player
José Luis López (handballer) (born 1998), Chilean handball player

Politicians
José Hilario López (1798–1869), Colombian president and military officer
José López Portillo y Rojas (1850–1923), Mexican writer and politician
José López Rega (1916–1989), Argentine politician
José López Portillo y Pacheco (1920–2004), Mexican president
José Francisco López, Argentine politician detained pending trial

Arts and entertainment
José López Rubio (1903–1996), Spanish writer and director
José Luis López Vázquez (1922–2009), Spanish actor
José Serafín López (died 1935), Chilean politician
José "Nuno" López (born 1951), Puerto Rican politician

Other
José Antonio López (1781–1841), Spanish Mexican Jesuit
José M. López (1910–2005), American soldier
José Salazar López (1910–1991), Mexican cardinal
José Venancio López (1791–1863), Guatemalan jurist and politician
 José M. López (judge),  District of Columbia judge